The barasingha (Rucervus duvaucelii), also known as the swamp deer, is a deer species distributed in the Indian subcontinent. Populations in northern and central India are fragmented, and two isolated populations occur in southwestern Nepal. It has been extirpated in Pakistan and Bangladesh, and its presence is uncertain in Bhutan.

The specific name commemorates the French naturalist Alfred Duvaucel.

The swamp deer differs from all other Indian deer species in that the antlers carry more than three tines. Because of this distinctive character it is designated bārah-singgā, meaning "twelve-horned" in Hindi. Mature stags usually have 10 to 14 tines, and some have been known to have up to 20.

In Assamese, barasingha is called dolhorina; dol meaning swamp.

Characteristics
Its hair is rather woolly and yellowish brown above but paler below, with white spots along the spine. The throat, belly, inside of the thighs and beneath the tail is white. In summer, the coat becomes bright rufous-brown. The neck is maned. Females are paler than males. Young are spotted. A record antler measured  round the curve.

Stags weigh .

Distribution and habitat

In the 19th century, swamp deer ranged along the base of the Himalayas from Upper Assam to the west of the Yamuna River, throughout Assam, in a few places in the Indo-Gangetic plain from the Eastern Sundarbans to Upper Sind, and locally throughout the area between the Ganges and Godavari as far east as Mandla. Swamp deer was also common in parts of the Upper Narmada valley and to the south in Bastar.
They frequent flat or undulating grasslands and generally keep in the outskirts of forests. Sometimes, they are also found in open forest.

In the 1960s, the total population was estimated at 1,600 to less than 2,150 individuals in India and about 1,600 in Nepal. Today, the distribution is much reduced and fragmented due to major losses in the 1930s–1960s following unregulated hunting and conversion of large tracts of grassland to cropland. Swamp deer occur in the Kanha National Park of Madhya Pradesh, in two localities in Assam, and in only 6 localities in Uttar Pradesh. They are regionally extinct in West Bengal. 
They are also probably extinct in Arunachal Pradesh. A few survive in Assam's Kaziranga and Manas National Parks.
In 2005, a small population of about 320 individuals was discovered in the Jhilmil Jheel Conservation Reserve in Haridwar district in Uttarakhand on the east bank of the Ganges. This represents the northern limit of the species.

Distribution of subspecies 
Three subspecies are currently recognized:
 Western swamp deer R. d. duvauceli (Cuvier, 1823) – the nominate subspecies, and most abundant, this water-loving deer has splayed hooves and is adapted to the flooded grassland habitat of the Indo-Gangetic plain; in the early 1990s, populations in India were estimated at 1,500–2,000 individuals, and 1,500–1,900 individuals in the Sukla Phanta Wildlife Reserve of Nepal; latter population reached 2,170 individuals including 385 fawns in spring 2013. Few zoos and wildlife parks raise barasingha, let alone breed them; however, the San Diego Zoo Safari Park in San Diego, California has successfully cared for and bred western barasingha since the 1970s.
 Southern swamp deer R. d. branderi (Pocock 1943) – has hard hooves and is adapted to hard ground in open sal forest, with a grass understorey; survives only in the Kanha National Park, an area between states, to the west of Chhattisgarh and east of Madhya Pradesh. The population numbered about 500 individuals in 1988; 300–350 individuals were estimated at the turn of the century; and 750 in 2016. It was reintroduced into Satpura Tiger Reserve. There is a herd of southern barasingha in the United Kingdom, at the Port Lympne Wild Animal Park, Kent, England.
 Eastern swamp deer R. d. ranjitsinhi (Grooves 1982) –  is only found in Assam, where the population numbered about 700 individuals in 1978; 400–500 individuals were estimated in Kaziranga National Park at the turn of the century. After a census conducted in 2021, 868 individuals were estimated in the park, with a further 121 in Manas National Park.

Ecology and behaviour 

Swamp deer are mainly grazers.
They largely feed on grasses and aquatic plants, foremost on Saccharum, Imperata cylindrica, Narenga porphyrocoma, Phragmites karka, Oryza rufipogon, Hygroryza and Hydrilla. They feed throughout the day with peaks during the mornings and late afternoons to evenings. In winter and monsoon, they drink water twice, and thrice or more in summer. In the hot season, they rest in the shade of trees during the day.

In central India, the herds comprise on average about 8–20 individuals, with large herds of up to 60. There are twice as many females than males. During the rut they form large herds of adults. The breeding season lasts from September to April, and births occur after a gestation of 240–250 days in August to November. The peak is in September and October in Kanha National Park. They give birth to single calves.

When alarmed, they give out shrill, baying alarm calls.

Threats 

The swamp deer populations outside protected areas and seasonally migrating populations are threatened by poaching for antlers and meat, which are sold in local markets. Swamp deer lost most of its former range because wetlands were converted and used for agriculture so that suitable habitat was reduced to small and isolated fragments. The remaining habitat in protected areas is threatened by the change in river dynamics, reduced water flow during summer, increasing siltation, and is further degraded by local people who cut grass, timber and fuelwood, and by illegal farming on government land.

George Schaller wrote: "Most of these remnants have or soon will have reached the point of no return."

Conservation 
Rucervus duvaucelii is listed on CITES Appendix I. In India, it is included under Schedule I of the Wildlife Protection Act of 1972.

In captivity 

In 1992, there were about 50 individuals in five Indian zoos and 300 in various zoos in North America and Europe.

Swamp deer were introduced to Texas. They exist only in small numbers on ranches.

In culture 
Rudyard Kipling in The Second Jungle Book featured a barasingha in the chapter "The Miracle of Purun Bhagat" by the name of "barasingh". It befriends Purun Bhagat because the man rubs the stag's velvet off his horns. Purun Bhagat then gives the barasinga nights in the shrine at which he is staying, with his warm fire, along with a few fresh chestnuts every now and then. Later as pay, the stag warns Purun Bhagat and his town about how the mountain on which they live is crumbling.

Barasingha is the state animal of the Indian states of Madhya Pradesh and Uttar Pradesh.

See also
Chital
Sambar deer

References

Further reading 
 M. Acharya, M. Barad, S. Bhalani, P. Bilgi, M. Panchal, V. Shrimali, W. Solanki, D.M. Thumber. Kanha Chronicle. Centre for Environment Education, Ahmedabad in collaboration with the United States National Park Service.

External links

 Animal Info: Barasingha
 World Association of Zoos and Aquariums: Barasingha – Cervus duvaucelii

Fauna of South Asia
Mammals of Nepal
Mammals of India
Mammals described in 1823
Taxa named by Georges Cuvier
Symbols of Madhya Pradesh
Symbols of Uttar Pradesh
Fauna of Uttar Pradesh